Justice Ilsley may refer to:

Harry P. Ilsley (1884–1953), justice of the Wyoming Supreme Court
James Lorimer Ilsley (1894–1967), chief justice of the Nova Scotia Supreme Court